Vladimir Blotsky (born 10 November 1977, Klin, Klinsky District, Moscow Oblast) is a Russian political figure and a deputy of the 7th and 8th State Dumas.
 
In 2001, Blotsky started working as a legal adviser at the legal company "Sovremennoye pravo". In 2005, he headed the legal department of the Management company "Flotoceanprodukt" LLC. Later he worked as the General Director of the management companies Murmansk Trawl Fleet PJSC " and Murmansk Provincial Fleet JSC. In 2016, he became the deputy of the 7th State Duma from the Nizhny Novgorod Oblast. Since September 2021, he has served as deputy of the 8th State Duma.
 
In 2021, Blotsky took 46th place in the Forbes ranking of the wealthiest civil servants in Russia.

References
 

 

1977 births
Living people
Communist Party of the Russian Federation members
21st-century Russian politicians
Eighth convocation members of the State Duma (Russian Federation)
People from Klin